The Automotive Building is a heritage building at Exhibition Place in Toronto, Ontario, Canada, containing event and conference space. In the 1920s, as a result of burgeoning interest in automobiles, additional exhibition space for automotive exhibits during the annual Canadian National Exhibition (CNE) was needed. A design competition was held, and the winning design was submitted by Toronto architect Douglas Kertland. The building opened in 1929, and the "National Motor Show" exhibit of automobiles was held in the building until 1967. It was also used for trade shows. When it opened, it was claimed to be "the largest structure in North America designed exclusively to display passenger vehicles". During World War II, the building was used by the Royal Canadian Navy and named HMCS York. After the end of automotive exhibits at the CNE, the building was used for other CNE exhibits and continued to be used for trade shows. 

In the 2000s, the City of Toronto government decided to convert the facility to be a conference centre complementary to the National Trade Centre (now the Enercare Centre) across the street. The building was renovated, constructing a ballroom in the main exhibit hall and conference rooms on the mezzanine level. The ballroom is considered the largest in Toronto. No longer used by the CNE or trade shows, the building is used year-round for various public and private events and conferences. The CNE has twice sold the naming rights to the building. In 2009, it was christened the Allstream Centre and since March 2017 has been known as the Beanfield Centre. The current logo and signage reflects those agreements.

Description
The Automotive Building is a two-storey Art Deco building,  in size. The internal plan is a large open space, with a mezzanine on the second floor surrounding the main floor.

The structure's base is stone from a quarry near Queenston Heights, Ontario, with "artificial stone" up top. Sticking to all-Canadian material and workmanship added to the cost: using Indiana stone would have cost $989,299. The architect and general contractors noted that, while Queenston stone could be used throughout for an additional cost of $35,000, it would take too long for the shops to prepare the stone. The tender required the winner to pay "a minimum of 50 cents an hour for all men employed on the building."

The building now houses the Beanfield Centre conference centre, and it is connected underground to the underground parking garage of the Enercare Centre. The open floor was converted to a  ballroom, claimed to be largest in Toronto, which can be sub-divided in two. The original glass roof over the open floor was replaced with a new ceiling. The second floor mezzanine saw the addition of 20 meeting rooms.

Construction
Motor cars were first exhibited at the Canadian National Exhibition in 1897. In 1902, the CNE built the Transportation Building, where cars were displayed alongside streetcars, railway exhibits and carriages. Early automobiles on display included models from Autocar, Packard, Peerless, Stevens-Duryea and Thomas. The building was destroyed by fire and was replaced with a new building in 1909.  By 1911, there were no longer any horse-drawn vehicles on display. The display was named the National Motor Show in 1916.

As of 1928, the vehicles (including coupes, trucks, limousines, and buses) at the National Motor Show were overflowing into the Coliseum "and other places," including the Electrical Building. Visitors to the fair were noted to be increasingly coming by car, suggesting that every "state in the union is likely to be represented in the array of motor car markers on the grounds," and that it was "no new thing to see British Columbia and Alberta markers on the grounds." Officials had spots narrowed by roughly a foot, to increase capacity, and introduced parking attendants.

A 1928 Daily Star article published in the afternoon edition on Highways and Automotive Day pegged the total value of automobiles on display at over a million dollars. The CNE directors held a luncheon hosting "leaders in the automotive world". Speakers included the general manager of Canadian Goodyear Rubber Co. C. H. Carlisle]], and Dr.[P. E. Doolittle, "well-known pathfinder" and president of the Canadian Automobile Association. As a result of the popularity, there was talk of building a new automotive building, perhaps even in time for the next fair. The CNE President noted he'd meet with members of the industry and civic authorities on the proposal. The Globe noted that "sympathetic consideration of this exists in the minds of the City Council," noting the increase in overcrowding every year, but still was cautious about chances.

A design contest was announced in later October 1928 and launched in early November, with the purpose of starting work in the winter so that the building would be complete in time for the 1929 CNE. The contest received thirty potential designs for the structure. The winner,  was local architect Douglas Kertland, apparently winning by a slim point margin, was announced December 12, 1928. Charles B. Dolphin won second place, and Mathers & Haldenby third. Deemed the "most elaborate automotive building in the world", the CNEA withheld the design until they could adjust the interior.

It was to be built "immediately south" of the Electrical & Engineering Building. Cost was estimated at $1 million upon announcement, tendered at $1,000,299.26, and $1,000,299 upon the beginning of construction. The main storey was to offer  of exhibition area, and the mezzanine floor . This was twice the area of the Electrical Building. It was to feature "modern lighting of the indirect type." It was to include a "public dining-room of sumptuous appointments." Decorative iron work was to be used throughout.

Construction work was underway as of early April 1929. The Globe noted there was "no pomp or ceremony" to mark the start. The cornerstone was laid June 12, 1929 by Sam Harris, VP, with invocation by Reverend F. C. Ward-Whate. The building was opened August 26, 1929 by Ontario Premier Howard Ferguson.

History
The building was initially used to display the latest car models to the public. The National Motor Show was last held in 1967. In 1974, the Canadian International AutoShow appeared elsewhere in the city during the spring, closer in time to when new car models appear than in late August when the CNE starts.

During World War II, this building was the home to Toronto's naval reserve, known as HMCS York. A commemorative plaque to this can be found on the north side of the building. In 1949, Maple Leaf Gardens builder and Toronto Maple Leafs owner Conn Smythe proposed converting the building into four ice arenas.

In 1988, the building was designated a "listed" heritage structure. In 1999, a study of the-then Direct Energy Centre determined that it had a lack of meeting space compared to other similar facilities in North America. In 2004, the CNE and City of Toronto approved a 47 million renovation of the Automotive Building so that it would provide the meeting space. It re-opened in 2009 as the Allstream Centre. Since 2009, the building has been used exclusively for meetings, events and conferences. In 2017, a new sponsorship agreement with the City of Toronto led to the conference centre being renamed to the Beanfield Centre.

Past uses
During the CNE:
 Art, manual education, home economics, and school projects from across the province, including work by auxiliary students and the disabled, in the Mezzanine. Displays moved there in 1939.
 Seventh Annual Shirley Temple "movie double" competition
 National Motor Show, 1929–1967
 "Farm, Food and Fun" displays, which had previously been hosted in the Agricultural buildings north of Princes' Boulevard.

Through the rest of the year:
 American Hospital Association Convention
 Art Directors' Club of Toronto annual exhibition of Advertising and Editorial Art
 Canadian Graphic Arts Show
 Canadian Mobile Home and Travel Trailer Show
 Canadian National Samples Show
 Canadian Packaging Exposition, later known as PacEx
 Canadian Winter Sports Show
 General Motors Motorama
 National Automotive Parts and Equipment Show
 Plastics Show of Canada
 Toronto International Boat Show and National Marine Trade Show

As Allstream Centre
 Annual "Dragon Ball"
 Juno Awards Dinner 2011

Gallery
Exterior

Interior

References

External links
 Beanfield Centre website

Buildings and structures in Toronto
City of Toronto Heritage Properties
Exhibition Place
1929 establishments in Ontario
Buildings and structures completed in 1929